Read Township is a township in Clayton County, Iowa, USA.  As of the 2000 census, its population was 300.

History
Read Township was organized in 1856. It is named for Robert R. Read.

Geography
According to the USGS, it contains six cemeteries: Clayton Center, Colony Catholic, County Home, Meenan, Union and Zion Lutheran.

The streams of Bente Branch and Spring Branch run through this township.

Notes

References
 USGS Geographic Names Information System (GNIS)

External links
 US-Counties.com
 City-Data.com

Townships in Clayton County, Iowa
Townships in Iowa
1856 establishments in Iowa
Populated places established in 1856